Delta Force 2 is a tactical first-person shooter video game developed by NovaLogic and released in 1999. It is the second game in the Delta Force series and was followed by Delta Force: Land Warrior one year later. The game was re-released in 2009 on Steam.

Gameplay

The player assumes the role of a Delta Force operative who takes part in missions across the globe. The action takes place in vast outdoor environments and combat distances reach up to several hundred meters. The game has an emphasis on realism, with human enemies and the player alike being very vulnerable to damage from weapons, and projectiles being subject to wind conditions.

Missions consist of a series of objectives while navigation points indicate what to do, the player is free to approach the targets as he sees fit. Objectives typically involve eliminating all hostile presence in a specific location, rescuing hostages, or destroying enemy vehicles and facilities. Many missions feature allied Delta Force teams which follow commands predefined by the mission design, and who can also be issued orders by the player. The player can view the positions of nearby enemies and friendly units through the use of a minimap on their HUD.

Game engine 
The game continues to use NovaLogic's proprietary Voxel Space engine from its earlier games, including the original Delta Force and the Comanche series of helicopter combat simulators, known for its ability to render vast landscapes. This updated version of the engine is dubbed Voxel Space 32, as it is optimised for 32-bit graphics cards and does not support 16-bit cards anymore. All terrain is visualised by voxels while any characters, vehicles, structures or other details are polygonal. Unlike its predecessor, Delta Force 2 supports hardware acceleration. A new feature in Delta Force 2s version of the engine are stretched voxels which allow to simulate high grass, capable of masking characters at any distance.

Mission editor 
The game includes a mission editor which allows the user to place objects, enemies, and objectives in one of the game's existing landscapes.

Reception

The game received "average" reviews according to video game review aggregator GameRankings. Computer Gaming Worlds Brett Todd the game for "abysmal graphics", non-existent sound effects and a lack of background information on the missions. He also criticised the need to carefully scan the screen for small enemies in the distance as well as the game's poor performance, forcing the player to play on a small resolution even on high-end hardware and further worsening the trouble with spotting enemies. He praised the mission design and multiplayer mode for up to 50 players, however. GameSpots Michael E. Ryan was more enthusiastic. He particularly praised the mission design, calling it "generally excellent" and noting that the missions are usually "realistic and believable", with some exceptions more inspired by action films. He also praised the game's multiplayer mode and the sound design. Eric Bratcher of NextGen said of the game, "Not quite as tense or pretty as Rainbow Six, this is still a great game for Green Beret wanna-bes."

The game received a "Silver" sales award from the Entertainment and Leisure Software Publishers Association (ELSPA), indicating sales of at least 100,000 copies in the United Kingdom.

References

External links
Official Website

1999 video games
Cooperative video games
Delta Force (video game series)
First-person shooters
Tactical shooter video games
Video games about Delta Force
Video games developed in the United States
Video games featuring protagonists of selectable gender
Video games set in Africa
Video games set in Europe
Video games set in Northern Europe
Video games set in South America
Video games set in Asia
Video games set in the Middle East
Video games set in Uganda
Video games set in Chad
Video games set in Kazakhstan
Video games set in Georgia (country)
Video games set in Russia
Video games set in Antarctica
Video games with voxel graphics
Windows games
Windows-only games
NovaLogic games